The 51st Ohio Infantry Regiment was an infantry regiment of the Union Army during the American Civil War.

Service
The 51st Ohio Infantry Regiment was organized at Camp Meigs in Dover, Ohio, on September 17, 1861, mustered for three years of service on October 26, 1861, under the command of Colonel Thomas Stanley Matthews.  The regiment was recruited in Coshocton, Darke, Madison, and Tuscarawas counties.

The regiment was attached to the 15th Brigade, Army of the Ohio until December 1861 and to the 15th Brigade, 4th Division, Army of the Ohio until March 1862. It was unattached in Nashville, Tennessee, until June 1862, when it went to the 10th Brigade, 4th Division, Army of the Ohio, until July 1862. It was with the 23rd Independent Brigade, Army of the Ohio until August 1862, the 23rd Brigade, 5th Division, Army of the Ohio until September 1862 and the 23rd Brigade, 5th Division, II Corps, Army of the Ohio to November 1862. Afterward, it was attached to the 3rd Brigade, 3rd Division, Left Wing, XIV Corps, Army of the Cumberland until January 1863, to the 3rd Brigade, 3rd Division, XXI Corps, Army of the Cumberland until October 1863, the 2nd Brigade, 1st Division, IV Corps until June 1865, the 1st Brigade, 1st Division, IV Corps until August 1865 and the Department of Texas until October 1865.

The 51st Ohio Infantry mustered out of service at Victoria, Texas, on October 3, 1865.  The regiment was discharged in Columbus, Ohio, on November 3, 1865.

Detailed service

Adapted from Ohio in the Civil War: 51st Ohio Volunteer Infantry by Larry Stevens:

1862 

 Moved to Wellsville November 3, thence to Louisville, Kentucky, and had duty there until December 10.
 Duty at Camp Wickliffe, Kentucky., until February 1862.
 Expedition down the Ohio River to reinforce General Grant, thence to Nashville, Tennessee, February 14–25.
 Occupation of Nashville February 25. Provost duty there until July 9. 
 Moved to Tullahoma, Tennessee, and joined Nelson's Division.
 March to Louisville, Kentucky, in pursuit of Bragg August 21-September 26. 
 Pursuit of Bragg into Kentucky October 1–22. 
 Battle of Perryville, Kentucky, October 8.
 March to Nashville, Tennessee, October 22-November 7, and duty there until December 26.
 Dobbins' Ferry, near Lawrence, December 9. 
 Advance on Murfreesboro December 26–30. 
 Battle of Stones River December 30–31, 1862 and January 1–3, 1863.

1863 

 Duty at Murfreesboro until June. Tullahoma Campaign June 23-July 7. 
 At McMinnville until August 16. 
 Passage of Cumberland Mountain and Tennessee River and Chickamauga Campaign August 16-September 22. 
 Battle of Chickamauga September 19–20. 
 Siege of Chattanooga, Tennessee, September 24-November 23.
 Reopening Tennessee River October 26–29. 
 Chattanooga-Ringgold Campaign November 23–27. 
 Lookout Mountain November 23–24. 
 Missionary Ridge November 25. 
 Ringgold Gap, Taylor's Ridge November 27. 
 Duty at Whiteside until January 1864.

1864 

 Reenlisted January 1, 1864. 
 At Blue Springs, near Cleveland, until May. 
 Atlanta Campaign May to September. 
 Tunnel Hill May 6–7. 
 Demonstration on Rocky Face Ridge and Dalton May 8–13.
 Buzzard's Roost Gap May 8–9. 
 Battle of Resaca May 14–15. 
 Near Kingston May 18–19. 
 Near Cassville May 19. 
 Advance on Dallas May 22–25. 
 Operations on line of Pumpkin Vine Creek and battles about Dallas, New Hope Church and Allatoona Hills May 25-June 5. 
 Operations about Marietta and against Kennesaw Mountain June 10-July 2. 
 Pine Hill June 11–14.
 Lost Mountain June 15–17. 
 Assault on Kennesaw June 27. 
 Ruff's Station, Smyrna Campground, July 4.
 Chattahoochee River July 5–17.
 Peachtree Creek July 19–20. 
 Siege of Atlanta July 22-August 25. 
 Flank movement on Jonesboro August 25–30. 
 Battle of Jonesboro August 31-September 1. 
 Lovejoy's Station September 2–6. 
 Operations against John Bell Hood in northern Georgia and northern Alabama September 29-November 3. 
 Moved to Pulaski, Tenn. 
 Nashville Campaign November–December. 
 Columbia, Duck River, November 24–27. 
 Battle of Franklin November 30. 
 Battle of Nashville December 15–16. 
 Pursuit of Hood to the Tennessee River December 17–28. 
 Moved to Huntsville, Alabama, and duty there until March 1865.

1865 

 Operations in eastern Tennessee March 15-April 22. 
 Duty at Nashville, Tennessee, until June.
 Ordered to New Orleans, La., June 16, thence to Texas. 
 Duty at Indianola, Green Lake and Victoria, Texas, to October."

Casualties
The regiment lost a total of 346 men during service; 4 officers and 108 enlisted men killed or mortally wounded, 1 officer and 233 enlisted men died of disease.

Commanders
 Colonel William P. N. Fitzgerald - appointed and resigned October 14, 1861
 Colonel Thomas Stanley Matthews (judge) - commissioned October 23, 1861, and resigned April 11, 1863
 Colonel Richard W. McClain - commanded at the battles of Perryville and Stones River as lieutenant colonel; promoted to colonel, April 14, 1863, and resigned September 30, 1864
 Colonel Charles H. Wood - commanded at the battle of Nashville as lieutenant colonel, promoted to colonel January 20, 1865 mustered out with unit October 3, 1865
 Colonel David W. Marshall - appointed regimental commander as lieutenant colonel

See also

 List of Ohio Civil War units
 Ohio in the Civil War

Notes and references
 Dyer, Frederick H. A Compendium of the War of the Rebellion (Des Moines, IA:  Dyer Pub. Co.), 1908.
 Helwig, Simon.  The Capture and Prison Life in Rebeldom for Fourteen Months of Simon Helwig, late Private Co. F. 51st O.V.I. (Canal Dover, OH: Bixler Printing Company), n.d.
 Ohio Roster Commission. Official Roster of the Soldiers of the State of Ohio in the War on the Rebellion, 1861–1865, Compiled Under the Direction of the Roster Commission (Akron, OH: Werner Co.), 1886–1895.
 Reid, Whitelaw. Ohio in the War: Her Statesmen, Her Generals, and Soldiers (Cincinnati, OH: Moore, Wilstach, & Baldwin), 1868. 
 Schaar, Nancy Boothe.  Letters from the 51st OVI (New Philadelphia, OH: Tuscarawas County Genealogical Society), 2001.
Attribution

References

External links
 Ohio in the Civil War: 51st Ohio Volunteer Infantry by Larry Stevens
 National flag of the 51st Ohio Infantry
 National flag of the 51st Ohio Veteran Volunteer Infantry
 51st Ohio Volunteer Infantry, Company B living history organization

Military units and formations established in 1861
Military units and formations disestablished in 1865
Units and formations of the Union Army from Ohio
1861 establishments in Ohio